Desmond King II (born December 14, 1994) is an American football cornerback for the Houston Texans of the National Football League (NFL). He earned All-Pro honors in 2018 as both a defensive back and a punt returner. He played college football at Iowa, and was drafted by the Los Angeles Chargers in the fifth round of the 2017 NFL Draft. He has also played for the Tennessee Titans.

High school career
King attended East English Village Preparatory Academy in Detroit, Michigan. He played defensive back and running back for the Bulldogs football team. During his career, he set a Michigan high school record with 29 interceptions. He also set a school record for career rushing yards and had 2,360 as a senior. King was rated by Rivals.com a three-star recruit and committed to the University of Iowa to play college football.

College career
King attended Iowa under head coach Kirk Ferentz. As a true freshman at the University of Iowa in 2013, King appeared in all 13 games and made 12 starts. He was the first true freshman to start at defensive back for Iowa since 2002. He started all 13 games his sophomore year in 2014 and had 64 tackles and three interceptions. King returned as a starter his junior year in 2015. He also became Iowa's punt and kick returner.  After a terrific junior season in which he had 43 tackles, and a Big-Ten high 8 interceptions, King was named a consensus first-team All-American and won the 2015 Jim Thorpe Award, which is given to the best defensive back in all of college football.  Despite being projected as an early-round pick in the 2016 NFL Draft, King announced that he would return to Iowa for his senior season. On November 29, 2016, King was name First-team All-Big Ten for the second season in a row. He was also named a 2016 AP Second-team All-American.

College statistics

Professional career

Los Angeles Chargers 
The Los Angeles Chargers selected King in the fifth round with the 151st overall pick in the 2017 NFL Draft. He was the 21st cornerback and the last of four Iowa players drafted in 2017.

On May 11, 2017, the Los Angeles Chargers signed King to a four-year, $2.67 million contract that includes a signing bonus of $279,992.

2017 season 
Throughout training camp, King competed for the role as the third cornerback on the depth chart against Trevor Williams, Steve Williams, Craig Mager, and Trovon Reed. Head coach Anthony Lynn named King the starting nickelback and the fourth cornerback on the depth chart to start the regular season, behind Jason Verrett, Casey Hayward, and Trevor Williams. Special teams coach George Stewart named King the secondary kick returner, along with wide receiver Isaiah Burse.

He made his professional regular season debut in the Los Angeles Chargers' season-opener at the Denver Broncos and made one pass deflection during their 24–21 loss. Starting cornerback Jason Verrett suffered a torn ACL during the game and was placed on injured reserve for the rest of the season. King was promoted to the third cornerback on the depth chart behind Casey Hayward and Trevor Williams in his absence. The following week, King earned his first career start as the starting nickelback and collected six combined tackles in a 19–17 loss to the Miami Dolphins. In Week 8, King recorded four solo tackles and made his first career sack on Tom Brady during a 21–13 loss at the New England Patriots. On November 23, 2017, King recorded five solo tackles, a pass break up, and returned his first career interception off Dak Prescott for a 90-yard touchdown during a 28–6 victory at the Dallas Cowboys on Thanksgiving. On December 10, 2017, King made his fourth career start and made a season-high ten combined tackles, a pass deflection, and sacked Washington Redskins' quarterback Kirk Cousins during the Chargers' 30–13 victory. He also returned 17 kickoffs for 353 yards. He received an overall grade of 86.5 from Pro Football Focus in 2017, which ranked as the 14th highest grade among all qualifying cornerbacks. His grade was also the third highest among all rookie cornerbacks in 2017.

2018 season
King entered training camp slated as a backup cornerback, but became the slot cornerback after Jason Verrett tore his Achilles tendon on the first day of training camp. Head coach Anthony Lynn named King the first-team nickelback and third cornerback on the depth chart to begin the regular season, behind starters Casey Hayward and Trevor Williams.

On October 14, 2018, King recorded two solo tackles, three pass deflections, and intercepted two pass attempts by Browns’ quarterback Baker Mayfield during a 38–14 victory at the Cleveland Browns in Week 6. On November 4, 2018, King made three combined tackles, broke up two pass attempts, and returned an interception for a 42-yard touchdown during a 25–17 win over the Seattle Seahawks in Week 9. King intercepted a pass by Seahawks’ quarterback Russell Wilson, which was intended for wide receiver David Moore, during the fourth quarter. His performance in a Week 9 earned him AFC Defensive Player of the Week. In Week 13, King collected a season-high ten combined tackles (nine solo) and returned a punt for a 73-yard touchdown as the Chargers defeated the Pittsburgh Steelers 33–30. He received AFC Special Teams Player of the Week for his performance. He finished the season with 67 combined tackles (47 solo), ten pass deflections, three interceptions, a forced fumble, and one touchdown in 16 games and eight starts. King also had 22 punt returns for 522 yards (23.7 YPR) and 23 kick returns 318 yards and one touchdown (13.8 YPR). King received an overall grade of 90.4 from Pro Football Focus in 2018, which ranked as the second highest grade among all cornerbacks. On January 4, 2019, King was named to the Associated Press All-Pro Team, earning first-team accolades as a defensive back and second-team as a punt returner.

The Los Angeles Chargers finished tied atop the AFC West with a 12–4 record in 2018 and earned a Wild Card berth. On January 6, 2019, King started his first career playoff game and recorded four combined tackles and one sack during the Chargers’ 23–17 victory at the Baltimore Ravens in the AFC Wild Card Round.

2019 season
In Week 4 against the Miami Dolphins, King sacked quarterback Josh Rosen 2.5 times in the 30–10 win. In Week 5 against the Denver Broncos, King returned a punt for a 68-yard touchdown in the 20–13 loss. In the 2019 season, King finished with 51 total tackles, two passes defended, and one forced fumble.

Tennessee Titans 
On November 2, 2020, King was traded to the Tennessee Titans in exchange for a sixth round pick in the 2021 NFL Draft. King made his debut with the Titans in Week 9 against the Chicago Bears.  During the game, King recovered a fumble forced by teammate Jeffery Simmons on David Montgomery and returned it for a 63-yard touchdown during the 24–17 win. In the 2020 season, he finished with 55 total tackles, two passes defended, and one fumble recovery.

Houston Texans
King signed with the Houston Texans on March 30, 2021. He was named a starting cornerback in 2021, recording a career-high 93 tackles, six passes defensed, and three interceptions.

On March 21, 2022, King signed a two-year contract extension with the Texans. In the 2022 season, he appeared in all 17 games, of which he started 13. He finished with 89 total tackles, two interceptions, and eight passes defended.

NFL career statistics

Regular season

References

External links

Houston Texans bio
Iowa Hawkeyes bio

1994 births
Living people
Players of American football from Detroit
American football cornerbacks
Iowa Hawkeyes football players
All-American college football players
Los Angeles Chargers players
Tennessee Titans players
Houston Texans players